is a train station in Miyazaki City, Miyazaki Prefecture, Japan.

Lines

Layout 
The station, which is unstaffed, consists of a side platform serving a single track on a sidehill cutting. There is no station building, only a shelter on the platform for waiting passengers. A ramp leads up to the platform from the access road.

Adjacent stations

History
Japanese National Railways (JNR) opened the station on 1 December 1966 as an additional station on the existing track of the Nichinan Line. With the privatization of JNR on 1 April 1987, the station came under the control of JR Kyushu.

Passenger statistics
In fiscal 2016, the station was used by an average of 23 passengers (boarding only) per day.

See also
List of railway stations in Japan

References

External links
Oryūzako (JR Kyushu)

Railway stations in Miyazaki Prefecture
Railway stations in Japan opened in 1966
Miyazaki (city)